The Toilers League, also designated the Workers League or Ligue des Travailleurs (LT) in French, is a Lebanese left-wing political party founded in Lebanon at the late 1960s and currently led by former Chouf MP Zaher el-Khatib.

Origins
The Toilers League originated from a previous socialist students association formed at the American University of Beirut (AUB) in 1968 by the then student activist and Progressive Socialist Party (PSP) militant Zaher el-Khatib. In 1974 the group broke away from the PSP and re-emerged as a separated political party under Khatib's leadership, who had previously succeeded to be elected to the Lebanese Parliament as the socialist deputy for the Iqlim al-Kharrub district of the Chouf in the 1971 Chouf parliamentary by-election, after the death of his father Anwar el-Khatib (the incumbent Sunni MP representing the Chouf) in 1970.

Political beliefs
Marxist–Leninist and Pan-Arab nationalist in ideology, the League joined Kamal Jumblatt's Lebanese National Movement (LNM) in early 1975, even raising a militia named the Zafer el-Khatib Forces – ZKF (Arabic: قوات ظافر الخطيب | Al-Quwwat Zafer el-Khatib), also known as Les Forces de Zafer el-Khatib (FZK) in French. After the collapse of the LNM alliance in 1982, the WL/ZKF switched their alligence to Syria and established a close relationship with the Shia Amal Movement.

The Toilers League in the Lebanese Civil War 1975–1990
During the early phase of the Lebanese Civil War the ZKF's strength peaked at about 200-500 male and female fighters, mostly Sunnis, who fought in the ranks of the LNM/Joint Forces. Equipped with infantry small-arms pilfered from Lebanese Army (LAF) barracks and Internal Security Forces (ISF) Police stations or supplied by the PLO, along with a few technicals armed with Heavy machine-guns and Recoilless rifles, the League/ZKF operated mainly in central West Beirut, but heavy casualties and desertions led to the decline of their military role afterwards. By the late 1980s the League had lost what was left of its political support base, whilst its dwindling ZKF militia was reduced to a neighbourhood defense group confined to their Headquarters at Rue Hamra – located on the namesake district – and adjacent Ras Beirut sector, where they ran a joint television service, "The Orient", with the Amal Movement until 1990.

The post-war years
Upon the end of the war in October 1990, the ZKF militia forces operating in the Capital were ordered by the Lebanese Government on March 28, 1991, to disband and surrender their heavy weaponry by April 30 as stipulated by the Taif Agreement. Although the ZKF militia was disbanded, the Toilers League remained politically active, even managing to pull some seats in the elections for the Lebanese Parliament on several occasions – from 2000 to 2005 their member of Parliament (MP) Nasser Kandil represented Beirut's 3rd electoral district. The Party is currently a member of the pro-Syrian March 8 Alliance.

See also
Amal Movement
Mountain War (Lebanon)
Organization of Communist Action in Lebanon
Progressive Socialist Party
People's Liberation Army (Lebanon)
Popular Guard
Lebanese Arab Army
Lebanese Civil War
Lebanese Communist Party
Lebanese National Movement
 List of weapons of the Lebanese Civil War

Notes

References

Denise Ammoun, Histoire du Liban contemporain: Tome 2 1943-1990, Fayard, Paris 2005.  (in French) – 
Edgar O'Ballance, Civil War in Lebanon, 1975-92, Palgrave Macmillan, London 1998. 
 Fawwaz Traboulsi, Identités et solidarités croisées dans les conflits du Liban contemporain; Chapitre 12: L'économie politique des milices: le phénomène mafieux, Thèse de Doctorat d'Histoire – 1993, Université de Paris VIII, 2007. (in French) – 
 Fawwaz Traboulsi, A History of Modern Lebanon: Second Edition, Pluto Press, London 2012. 
 Marius Deeb, The Lebanese Civil War, Praeger Publishers Inc., New York 1980. 
 Oren Barak, The Lebanese Army – A National institution in a divided society, State University of New York Press, Albany 2009.  – 
Jean Sarkis, Histoire de la guerre du Liban, Presses Universitaires de France - PUF, Paris 1993.  (in French)
 Rex Brynen, Sanctuary and Survival: the PLO in Lebanon, Boulder: Westview Press, Oxford 1990.  – 
Robert Fisk, Pity the Nation: Lebanon at War, London: Oxford University Press, (3rd ed. 2001).  – 
 William W. Harris, Faces of Lebanon: Sects, Wars, and Global Extensions, Princeton Series on the Middle East, Markus Wiener Publishers, Princeton 1997. , 1-55876-115-2

External links
Anwar El-Khatib (1910-1970)-A sorely missed jurist.

Arab nationalism in Lebanon
Arab nationalist militant groups
Factions in the Lebanese Civil War
Israeli–Lebanese conflict
Nasserist political parties
Nationalist parties in Lebanon
Socialist parties in Lebanon